Basir Ahamad (born 11 September 2003) is a Nepalese cricketer. He made his Twenty20 debut on 1 May 2022, for Nepal against Zimbabwe A. He made his List A debut on 9 May 2022, for Nepal, also against Zimbabwe A. In June 2022, he was named in Nepal's One Day International (ODI) squad for round 14 of the 2019–2023 ICC Cricket World Cup League 2 in Scotland. He made his ODI debut on 11 July 2022, against Namibia. In August 2022, he was named in Nepal's Twenty20 International (T20I) squad for the their series against Kenya. He made his T20I debut on 26 August 2022, against Kenya.

References

External links
 

2003 births
Living people
Nepalese cricketers
Nepal One Day International cricketers
Nepal Twenty20 International cricketers
People from Kapilvastu District